Brian O'Connell (23 January 1930 – 21 March 2011) was an American author, academic, and public administrator who helped found Independent Sector, an organization that represents the interests of charities, foundations and nonprofit giving programs in the United States.

In 1980, O’Connell joined John W. Gardner, the Secretary of Health, Education and Welfare in the Johnson administration and the founder of Common Cause, to create Independent Sector, which now (2012) has 550 member nonprofit organizations.  O’Connell and Gardner, who died in 2002, saw the need for an umbrella organization that could speak for all charities and other nonprofit groups and represent their interests in Washington.

Biography

Early life and education
Brian O’Connell was born on Jan. 23, 1930, in Worcester, Mass.  After earning a bachelor's degree from Tufts University in 1953 he did graduate work in public administration at the Maxwell School at Syracuse University.

Career
He went to work for the American Heart Association as a field representative, then became director of its operations in Maryland and California.

In 1966 he was named the executive director of the National Mental Health Association (now Mental Health America), where he was a leader in promoting new ideas about community care and educating the public about new research on depression. He also helped organize the National Committee on Patients’ Rights.

After leaving the association in 1978 he became the president of the National Council on Philanthropy and the executive director of the Coalition of National Voluntary Organizations.

While at Independent Sector, he helped found Civicus: World Alliance for Civic Participation.

After retiring from Independent Sector he spent the next decade as a professor of citizenship and public service at Tufts.  He helped found the Jonathan M. Tisch College of Citizenship and Public Service at Tufts, where he established the Brian O'Connell Library.

Public service
He was a trustee of Tufts University and a board member of Tisch College.

He also served on the boards of The Bridgespan Group, The Cape Cod Foundation, Ewing Marion Kauffman Foundation, the National Academy of Public Administration, Points of Light Foundation, Ima Hogg Foundation, and the National Assembly of Health and Social Welfare Organizations (now National Human Services Assembly). He was also chairman of the 1989 Salzburg Seminar on non-governmental organizations.

Honors and death
He was an elected Fellow of the American Public Health Association and the National Academy of Public Administration and received several honorary degrees, including a doctorate of humanities from Fairleigh Dickinson University and doctorate of laws from Indiana University.

He won a number of awards including a special John W. Gardner Leadership Award when he retired from Independent Sector; Weston Howland Award for Citizenship from the Lincoln Filene Center; Gold Key Award of the American Society of Association Executives; United Way of America's Award for Professionalism; the Chairman's Award of the National Society of Fund Raising Executives, the Tufts Presidential medal, and with John W. Gardner, the 1998 Tiffany Award for Public Service.

O'Connell died in 2011 in Chatham Mass. where he had lived since retiring from Independent Sector.

Work

Books
America's Voluntary Spirit: A Book of Readings, Foundation Center, 1983,
The Board Member's Book: Making A Difference In Voluntary Organizations, Foundation Center, 1985,
Philanthropy In Action, Foundation Center, 1987,
Volunteers in Action, Foundation Center, 1989,
People Power: Service, Advocacy, Empowerment : Selected Writings of Brian O'Connell, Foundation Center, 1994,
Board Overboard: Laughs And Lessons For All But The Perfect Nonprofit, Jossey Bass, 1995,
Powered By Coalition: The Story Of Independent Sector, Jossey Bass, 1998,
Voices From The Heart: In Celebration Of America's Volunteers, Chronicle Books, 1998,
Civil Society: The Underpinnings Of American Democracy, Tufts University Press, 1999,
Fifty Years In Public Causes: Stories From A Road Less Traveled, Tufts University Press, 2005,

Papers
The Right to Know, MH, 59, 2, 11-3, Spr 75
The Independent Sector: Uniquely American, New Directions for Experiential Learning, (New Partnerships: Higher Education and the Nonprofit Sector) n18 p17-24 Dec 1982
Citizenship and Community Service: Are They a Concern and Responsibility of Higher Education?, Paper presented at the National Conference of the American Association of Higher Education (Chicago, IL, March 17, 1985)
Strengthening Philanthropy and Voluntary Action, National Civic Review, 1987,
Budgeting and financial accountability (Nonprofit Management Series), Independent Sector, 1988
Finding, developing, and rewarding good board members (Nonprofit Management Series), Independent Sector, 1988
Recruiting, encouraging, and evaluating the chief staff officer (Nonprofit Management Series), Independent Sector, 1988
The role of the board and board members (Nonprofit Management Series), Independent Sector, 1988
Operating effective committees (Nonprofit Management Series), Independent Sector, 1988
Evaluating results (Nonprofit Management Series), Independent Sector, 1988
Conducting good meetings (Nonprofit Management Series), Independent Sector, 1988
The roles and relationships of the chief volunteer and chief staff officers, board, and staff: who does what? (Nonprofit Management Series), Independent Sector, 1988
Fund Raising (Nonprofit Management Series), Independent Sector, 1988
What Voluntary Activity Can and Cannot Do for America, Public Administration Review, v49 n5 p486-91 Sep-Oct 1989
Impact of nonprofits on civil society, National Civic Review, 1995,
A Major Transfer of Government Responsibility to Voluntary Organizations? Proceed with Caution, Public Administration Review; Vol. 56; pp. 222–225, 1996
Civil Society: Definitions and Descriptions, Nonprofit and Voluntary Sector Quarterly, September 2000; vol. 29, 3: pp. 471–478
Valuing Free Association, ASSOCIATIONS NOW, December 2006

References

Further reading
Young, D. R. (1993), An interview with Brian O'Connell. Nonprofit Management and Leadership, 3: 313–320.

External links
 NY Times: Brian O’Connell, Advocate for Philanthropies, Dies at 81 (Retrieved 1/5/2012)
 Independent Sector: Statement on the Death of Brian O'Connell (Retrieved 1/5/2012)
 Civicus
 Mental Health America
 The Bridgespan Group
 The Cape Cod Foundation
 Ima Hogg Foundation
 National Human Services Assembly
 Independent Sector Records, 1971-1996, Ruth Lilly Special Collections and Archives, IUPUI University Library, Indiana University Purdue University Indianapolis
 The Mission of Philanthropy in the University, Robert L. Payton, March 17, 1994, Independent Sector Research Symposium Honoring Brian O'Connell, (Retrieved 1/5/2012)

1930 births
2011 deaths
Tufts University alumni
Writers from Worcester, Massachusetts
Maxwell School of Citizenship and Public Affairs alumni